Events in the year 1997 in Bulgaria.

Incumbents 

 President: Zhelyu Zhelev (from 1990 until 22 January) Petar Stoyanov (from 22 January until 2002)
 Prime Minister: Zhan Videnov (from 1995 until February 13) Stefan Sofiyanski (from February 13 until May 21) Ivan Kostov (from May 21 until 2001)

Events 

 19 April – Parliamentary elections were held in Bulgaria.

References 

 
1990s in Bulgaria
Years of the 20th century in Bulgaria
Bulgaria
Bulgaria